The pey au (sometimes spelled pei au or pei ar) (Khmer: ប៉ីអ) is a Cambodian musical instrument, similar to a flute but using a set of double reeds to produce sound.  

The instrument uses an external reed, cut from a prebos tree and flattened with small strips of ratan. The bundle is insterted into a hold at the top of the flute part of the instrument, creating a mouthpiece. The instrument's body is made of "narrow bore bamboo", narrower than that used for the khloy vertical flute and pey pok. The instrument gives the pitch to be used in aareak and phleng kar wedding orchestras. Pitches are not standardized in Cambodia, although the spaces between pitches is. The instrument is ancient and predates the Angkor (9th—15th centuries A.D.), and has played with the aareak and aapeapipa orchestras for as long.

References

Cambodian musical instruments